Patni (pronounced as "Paatni") is an Indian surname. Notable people with the name include:

 Abdul Rehman Shakir Patni, India politician
 Narendra Patni (1942–2014), entrepreneur and IT visionary
 Rajendra Sukhanad Patni (born 1964), Indian politician
 Siddiq Patni (born 1964), Pakistani former cricketer

See also

References 

Indian surnames